Lorneville is a small settlement on the northern outskirts of Invercargill, in Southland, New Zealand.

Originally called Wallacetown Junction after the small settlement of Wallacetown, which lies immediately to the west, the main industries in the area have a long association with livestock farming, and both Lorneville and nearby Makarewa are best known to most New Zealanders as the sites of freezing works owned by the Alliance Group.

Populated places in Southland, New Zealand
Invercargill